Wei Yuansong was a former Buddhist monk who convinced Emperor Wu of Northern Zhou to abolish Buddhism. In 567, he submitted a memorial to the emperor stating that because Buddhist temples was against the interests of the nation, they should be abolished and Buddhist monastics be returned to lay life. His memorial was greatly influenced Emperor Wu's decision to outlaw Buddhism in 574. Buddhist scriptures and images were destroyed and Buddhist priests and nuns were returned to lay life. This is counted as one of the Four Buddhist Persecutions in China.

References 

Former Buddhists
Northern Zhou Buddhist monks
Persecution of Buddhists